Enerweena is a rural cadastral parish in Narromine County NSW, located at 32°26′54″S 147°58′04″  approximately 370km north west from Sydney, about 15 km north east of Albert and about 40km south west of Trangie. It is within the Narromine Council area at 32°37′54″S 148°12′04″E. 

It is in Narromine Shire.

References

Parishes of Narromine County